Murphy is an Irish surname and the most common surname in the Republic of Ireland.

Origins and variants 
The surname is a variant of two Irish surnames: "Ó Murchadha"/"Ó Murchadh" (descendant of "Murchadh"), and "Mac Murchaidh"/"Mac Murchadh" (son of "Murchadh") derived from the Irish personal name "Murchadh", which meant sea-warrior or sea-battler (muir meaning sea and cath meaning battle).

It is said of Murrough (Murchadh) as he entered the thick of the fight and prepared to assail the foreign invaders, the Danes, when they had repulsed the Dal-Cais, that 'he was seized with a boiling terrible anger, an excessive elevation and greatness of spirit and mind. A bird of valour and championship rose in him, and fluttered over his head and on his breath.

In modern Irish, "Ó Murchú", rather than "Ó Murchadha", is used.

"Murphy" is the most common surname in Ireland, the fourteenth most common surname in Northern Ireland, and the fifty-eighth most common surname in the United States.

People with the surname

Men
Aaron James Murphy (born 1992), New Zealand actor
Anthony Murphy (cricketer) (born 1962), English cricketer
Arthur Murphy (disambiguation), multiple people
Audie Murphy (1925–1971), American war hero and actor
Austin J. Murphy (born 1927), Democratic Congressman from Pennsylvania
Barnes Murphy (born 1947), former Gaelic footballer
Bos Murphy (1924–2000), New Zealand boxer
Brian Murphy (disambiguation), multiple people
Buddy Murphy, Australian professional wrestler
Byron Murphy (born 1998), American football player
Calvin Murphy (born 1948), American retired basketball player
Charles Murphy (disambiguation), multiple people
Chris Murphy (Connecticut politician) (born 1973), United States Senator from Connecticut
Ciarán Murphy, Irish T.D.
Cillian Murphy (born 1976), Irish actor
Colin Murphy (disambiguation), multiple people
Colm Murphy (born 1952), Irish alleged suspect in the Omagh bombing
Connor Murphy (born 1993), American ice hockey player
Conor Murphy, Sinn Féin politician in Northern Ireland
Dale Murphy (born 1956), American retired baseball player
Dale D. Murphy, professor at Georgetown University
Daniel Murphy (disambiguation), multiple people
Darren Murphy (born 1985), Irish footballer
Darren Murphy (Australian rules footballer) (born 1964) 
 Darren Murphy (1961–2012), bassist with the British punk rock/post-punk band Wasted Youth
Daryl Murphy, Irish football player
David Murphy (disambiguation), multiple people
 Derek Murphy (born 1968), American rapper better known as Sadat X
Dick Murphy (born 1942), American retired Republican politician
Donald E. Murphy (born 1960), American Republican politician
Donnie Murphy (born 1983), American baseball player
Eddie Murphy (disambiguation), multiple people
Edward Murphy (disambiguation), multiple people
Elliott Murphy (born 1949), American singer/songwriter
Erik Murphy (born 1990), American–Finnish basketball player
Everett J. Murphy (1852–1922), politician
Francis Murphy (disambiguation), multiple people
Frank Murphy (disambiguation), multiple people
Fred Murphy (disambiguation), multiple people
Gary Murphy (1972), Irish professional golfer
Gary Murphy (1948), New Zealand cricketer
Geoff Murphy (1938–2018), New Zealand filmmaker
 Geoffrey Mostyn Murphy (1922–2011), Australian boxer, better known as Tommy Burns
Glen Murphy (1957), British actor
George Murphy (1902–1992), American dancer, actor, and Republican Senator
Grayson Murphy (disambiguation)
Harold Lloyd Murphy (1927-2022), American judge
Henry Murphy (disambiguation), multiple people
Isaac Murphy (1802–1882), Republican Governor of Arkansas
Isaac Burns Murphy (1861–1896), American Hall-of-Fame jockey
Isaiah Murphy, a.k.a. Shinsaku Enomoto, (born 1998), Japanese basketball player
Jack Murphy (disambiguation), multiple people
Jacob Murphy (born 1995), English footballer
James Murphy (disambiguation), multiple people, people named James or Jimmy
Jim Murphy (disambiguation), multiple people
John Murphy (disambiguation), multiple people
Joseph Murphy (disambiguation), multiple people
Josh Murphy (born 1995), English footballer
Kevin Murphy (disambiguation), multiple people
Lambert Murphy (1885–?), American operatic tenor
Landau Eugene Murphy, Jr. (born 1974), American singer, winner of season 6 of America's Got Talent
Larry Murphy (disambiguation), multiple people
Lawrence Murphy (disambiguation), multiple people
Lionel Murphy (1922–1986), Australian politician and jurist
Loren E. Murphy (1882–1963), American jurist
Marc Murphy (footballer) (born 1987), Australian rules footballer
Mark Murphy (disambiguation), multiple people
Martin Murphy (disambiguation), multiple people
Matt Murphy (disambiguation), multiple people
Maurice Murphy (actor) (1913–1978), American actor
Michael Murphy (disambiguation), multiple people, people named Michael, Mick or Mike
Mickey Murphy (born 1985), Gaelic footballer
Miles Murphy (born 1967), Australian sprinter
Myles Murphy (disambiguation), multiple people, multiple people
Nicholas Murphy (born 1978), Gaelic footballer
Nicholas Daniel Murphy (1811–1890), Irish politician from Cork, Member of Parliament (MP) 1865–1880
Nick Murphy (disambiguation), multiple people
Oakes Murphy (1849–1908), two-time Governor of Arizona Territory
Pat Murphy (disambiguation), multiple people
Patricia Murphy (disambiguation), multiple people
Patrick Murphy (disambiguation), multiple people
Paul Murphy (disambiguation), multiple people
Peter Murphy (disambiguation), multiple people
Phil Murphy (disambiguation), multiple people, people named Phil, Philip or Phillip
Richard Murphy (disambiguation), multiple people, people named Richard, some nicknamed Dick
Robert Murphy (disambiguation), multiple people, people named Robert, Rob, Bob or Bobby
Roger P. Murphy, American legislator and jurist
Ryan Murphy (disambiguation), multiple people
Scott Murphy, American entrepreneur and politician
Scott Murphy (video game designer), a programmer behind the Space Quest series
Sean Murphy (disambiguation), multiple people
Sebastian Murphy (Captain, Founding Father of Utuado, Puerto Rico), b. circa 1696
Shaun Murphy (disambiguation), multiple people
Shawn Murphy (disambiguation), multiple people
Stephen Murphy (disambiguation), multiple people
Storm Murphy (born 1999), American basketball player
Sydney Murphy (born 1960), Vincentian retired cricketer
Timothy Murphy (disambiguation), multiple people, people named Timothy or Tim
Thomas Murphy (disambiguation), multiple people, people named Thomas or Tom
Trent Murphy (2013), outside linebacker in the National Football League; played for the Washington Redskins and Buffalo Bills
Troy Murphy, power forward for the Boston Celtics
Vincent B. Murphy, NYS Comptroller 1925–1926
Vincent J. Murphy, Mayor of Newark 1941–1949
Wendell H. Murphy, American politician
William Murphy (disambiguation), multiple people,
Yale Murphy (1869–1906), American baseball player
Yo Murphy (born 1971), American former football player

Women
Ashling Murphy, Irish teacher; suspected of being murdered
Alexis Murphy, American murder victim
Amee-Leigh Murphy Crowe (born 1995), Irish rugby sevens and union player
Annie Murphy (born 1986), Canadian actress
Brittany Murphy (1977–2009), American actress
Dervla Murphy (1931–2022), travel writer
Carolyn Murphy (born 1975), American model
Diana E. Murphy (1934–2018), American judge
Donna Murphy (born 1958), American Tony Award-winning actress
Erin Murphy (disambiguation), multiple people
Gail C. Murphy, Canadian computer scientist
Gillian Murphy, principal dancer at American Ballet Theatre
Jess Murphy, New Zealand-born chef based in Galway, Ireland
Julie Murphy (singer) (born 1961), Welsh singer
Julie Murphy (author), American novelist
Katherine Murphy, journalist, political editor of Guardian Australia
Kelly Murphy (born 1977), American author and illustrator
Margaret Mary Healy Murphy (1833–1907), American Catholic nun
Mary Murphy (disambiguation), multiple people
Róisín Murphy (born 1973), Irish electronica singer, songwriter, and producer
Shaun Murphy (singer), a.k.a. Stoney, American singer
Stephanie Murphy, Vietnamese-American politician
Stephanie J. Murphy, American veterinary scientist
Tammy Murphy (born 1965), American banker

Fictional characters
 Meg Murphy, the main character in the movie, Jinxed (2013)
 Murphy Cooper, in the film Interstellar
 Captain Ed Murphy, a character in the 1987 American buddy cop action movie Lethal Weapon
Captain Murphy from the Adult Swim animated series Sealab 2021
 Alex James Murphy, the police officer who became RoboCop
Alexis "Lex" Murphy, in the film Jurassic Park
 Frank, Sue, Bill, Kevin, and Maureen Murphy from the Netflix original F Is for Family
"Bleeding Gums" Murphy, on the cartoon TV series The Simpsons
Bridey Murphy, historical character in a hypnotic regression case detailed in Bernstein's The Search for Bridey Murphy
 Coach Murphy, a character in the 2009 American fantasy comedy movie 17 Again
Colin Murphy (fiction), in the American soap opera Days of Our Lives
 Connor Murphy, from the musical Dear Evan Hansen
Eric Murphy, in the HBO series Entourage
 Frank Murphy, in the movie Blue Thunder (1983)
 Hank Murphy, in the TV series Sullivan & Son (2012)
 John Murphy, in the TV series The 100
Karrin Murphy, in Jim Butcher's novel series The Dresden Files (named Connie Murphy in the TV series of the same title)
 Ken Murphy, a character in the 2009 American romantic comedy-drama movie He's Just Not That Into You
 Milo Murphy, in the American animated TV series Milo Murphy's Law
 Professor Michael Murphy, the protagonist in the Babylon Rising series by Dr Tim LaHaye
Randle Patrick McMurphy, one of the main characters in Ken Kesey's novel One Flew Over the Cuckoo's Nest (1962)
 Ray Murphy, birth name of Gino Esposito, in the Australian soap opera Neighbours
Sean Murphy (Oz), in the HBO TV drama series Oz
 Sergeant Murphy, a fictional character in the Richard Scarry books
 Susan Murphy, aka Ginormica, one of the main protagonists of the film Monsters vs. Aliens
 Alvin Bernard Murphy, in the TV series Z Nation

See also 
Justice Murphy (disambiguation)
Murph (disambiguation)

References 

Surnames
Irish families
Surnames of Irish origin
Occupational surnames
Anglicised Irish-language surnames
English-language surnames